Zvonimir Mihanović (born 1946) is a Croatian artist.

Early life
Zvonimir Mihanović was born in Donje Sitno on August 12, 1946 (today part of the Split-Dalmatia County).  Sitno was originally part of the Republic of Poljica and the Mihanović family roots can be traced in Sitno to the 17th century.

Education
After graduating high school in Split, Mihanović entered the Academy of Fine Arts in Zagreb, and then at the Accademia di Brera in Milan.  In 1971, Mihanović entered the Ecole Beaux Arts in Paris, graduating in 1976.

Croatian War of Independence
In 1991, the then president of Croatia enlisted Mihanović for the “Art-Garde” a group of artists writers etc who helped protect Croatian artistic treasures from looting and damage during the Croatian War of Independence, and he made contributions to this effort.

Mihanović was awarded the Order of Danica Hrvatska in 1996.

Museum Collections 

 Hunter Museum of American Art, Chattanooga, TN

Exhibitions 

1962: Salon of Young Artists; Split, Croatia
1966: Croatian Pavilion, Summer Olympics; Atlanta, GA
1973: Salon des Artistes Français; Société des Artistes Français; Paris, France
1978: Salon d'Automne; Paris, France (awarded Grande Prix and best young exhibitor).  Painting no. 1341, Silence.
1980: Findlay Galleries; New York, NY (1st solo exhibition in the United States)
1981: Museum of Modern Art, Dubrovnik, Croatia
1986: Findlay Galleries; New York, NY
1989: Findlay Galleries; New York, NY
1991: Museum of Modern Art, Dubrovnik, Croatia
1996: Parrish Art Museum; Southampton, NY
2012: Forbes Galleries; New York, NY
2021: Findlay Galleries; New York, NY

References

1946 births
People from Split-Dalmatia County
Hyperrealist artists
Living people